The DuPont–Whitehouse House is an Italianate-style house located at 3558 South Artesian Avenue in the McKinley Park neighborhood of Chicago, Illinois, United States.  The house was built between 1875 and 1876 by Oscar Cobb & Co. It was designated a Chicago Landmark on April 16, 1996.

References

Houses completed in 1876
Houses in Chicago
Chicago Landmarks
McKinley Park, Chicago